is a Tendai temple in Bungotakada, Oita Prefecture, Japan. The temple was established in 718. Its Amida-dō is generally called Fuki-ji Ō-dō. It is the oldest wooden structure in Kyushu. Ō-dō is designated a National Treasure. The seated image of the Amida-Nyōrai contained in Ō-dō is designated by the national government as an Important Cultural Property.

External links 

Fuki-ji Temple - Japan National Tourism Organization Official Website (in English)

Buddhist temples in Oita Prefecture
Tendai temples
National Treasures of Japan
Important Cultural Properties of Japan
8th-century establishments in Japan
Religious buildings and structures completed in 718